George Seymour Gabb M.B.E. (February 28, 1928 – March 1, 2007) was a Belizean artist, sculptor, writer and entertainer.

Career
Gabb was born in Belize City and educated no further than primary school. At age 13, he began to take up the arts and soon gained a following as a sculptor. Among his many creations are "The Sleeping Giant", a version of which is on the Belize $100 currency note, and the "Freedom of Thought" sculpture at the entrance to the city of Belmopan. He also had many other passions, and during his career he engaged in performance and entertainment, as well as writing poetry and plays. Some of his work in this area included "The Naked eye", a collection of poems and proverbs, and "Yellowtail", a play first performed in the 1960s. In 1974 he was awarded an M.B.E for his services by the British Empire.

Family
Gabb had six children, Elena, Antonio, Rupert, George, Jose, and Deirdre. George was chair of the CIS department in the School of Computer and Engineering Technologies at Miami Dade College, North Campus in Miami, Florida. His son, Rupert, was a prominent architect in Belize, designing and building multiple luxury resorts in the island of San Pedro, Belize. He and his son Rupert also collaborated to create the Belmopan Regional Language Center Monument.

His niece, Margaret Gabb-McKenzie, was the first female Chief Magistrate of Belize.

References

1928 births
2007 deaths
Belizean artists
Belizean poets
Belizean dramatists and playwrights
20th-century poets
20th-century dramatists and playwrights
20th-century Belizean writers
Members of the Order of the British Empire